The Columbus Owls were a minor league professional ice hockey team in the International Hockey League from 1973 to 1977. Prior to 1973, the team was known as the Columbus Golden Seals since 1971. After 1977, the team moved and became the Dayton Owls, and later the Grand Rapids Owls.  The longtime owner of the team while it was in Columbus, British-born mortgage writer Al Savill, leveraged his ownership of the club to purchase the Pittsburgh Penguins in 1975, which he owned until 1977.

References

International Hockey League (1945–2001) teams
Sports teams in Columbus, Ohio
Ice hockey teams in Ohio
Defunct ice hockey teams in Ohio
Ice hockey clubs established in 1973
Ice hockey clubs disestablished in 1977
1973 establishments in Ohio
1977 disestablishments in Ohio
Boston Bruins minor league affiliates